Jean-Max de Chavigny (born 12 October 1965) is a French former windsurfer. He competed in the men's Mistral One Design event at the 1996 Summer Olympics.

References

External links
 
 
 

1965 births
Living people
French male sailors (sport)
French windsurfers
Olympic sailors of France
Sailors at the 1996 Summer Olympics – Mistral One Design
Place of birth missing (living people)